The Beacon Lodge is an apartment building in Victoria, British Columbia, Canada. Located at 30 Douglas Street, the building is directly across from the start of the Trans-Canada Highway, and just down the street from the Beacon Drive In.

The building has 59 rental suites located on 4 separate floors, with the majority of them being small bachelors and a few one bedrooms. Many suites have views of the Olympic Mountains across the Juan de Fuca Strait in the Pacific Ocean and Beacon Hill Park.

History 
In 1945 Henri Côté and his wife Anne Marie, along with his parents, Joseph and Ida Côté, moved to Victoria from Edmonton, Alberta. Joseph Côté purchased the Beacon Cottage, an old historic building built in 1883. Being contractors by profession, both father and son renovated the building, converting it into a motel and renaming it the Tourist Lodge. They opened for business in 1946.

The Tourist Lodge was a haven for many traveler's looking for a peaceful retreat, especially those from the Canadian Prairies who were looking to get away from the harsh long winters. As the Côté's began to take root in the city, Henri Côté felt it was time to expand the business. Over the course of a year, the Beacon Lodge Motel was built. The building was built in front and attached to the existing Tourist Lodge and on September 15, 1949 was officially open for business. Two years later Joseph Côté died suddenly, and in his honour Cote Enterprises Ltd was formed in 1952. For the next several decades the Beacon Lodge operated as a successful motel, housing hundreds of guests each year. Its Art Deco and Streamline Moderne architecture, both inside and out, made it very trendy for guests during that time. The building included octagonal windows, a signature of Henri Côté, which he used on other projects he helped build in Victoria during that time.

In 1962, an additional renovation was conducted under Henri Côté's supervision. A fourth floor was added and an additional wing was constructed and attached to the southern back part of the Beacon Lodge. This final renovation brought the building up to its current specifications. A miniature lighthouse was erected on the northern part of the property by Henri Côté. Over the years, the lighthouse became a symbol to the many residents, giving them a sense of home and warmth offered by the Côté family.
The Beacon Lodge continued to operate as a motel until in the early 1970s when Henri Côté's youngest son, Bernie, joined the family business. Bernie persuaded to have the Lodge operate as an apartment rental instead. Since then the Beacon Lodge has continued to operate successfully as an apartment building. In 2008 Bernie’s two children Tristan and Hilary started working at the Beacon Lodge,  becoming the fourth generation to have a hand in the business. 2023 marks 77 years the Côté family have run the property.

Charitable Foundation 

In 1977 Henri and Marie Côté started a non-profit foundation called the Ray Côté Memorial Foundation in memory of their son Raymond who died of cancer in 1967 at the young age of 28. Their daughter Thérèse was sponsoring a boy in India and gave Henri the idea of a foundation to honour Ray who was so aware of the needs of others.

As a result, on August 15, 1977 the Ray Côté Memorial Foundation was started as a registered charity. In order to raise money to invest for the charity a large puzzle was purchased showing two men (who bore an uncanny resemblance to Ray and brother Robert). Each puzzle piece purchased added $13.33 towards the goal of $10,000, which once achieved be invested and the proceeds distributed to "help alleviate the suffering of the poor". Henri and Marie, along with other immediate family members invested a significant amount and eventually this goal was met. Registered charities were chosen for distribution of the interest earned each year.

In 1987 another son (Robert) died and Henri conceived the idea of changing the name of the foundation to the Côté Family Memorial Foundation. In the years since, Henri as well as Marie and a third son (Richard) have died.

The Côté Family Memorial Foundation strives primarily to help charities that do not have large budgets to solicit funds. In the 40 years since its inception, the Côté Family Memorial Foundation has successfully donated over $152,000 to the needs of individuals around the world, however most of the charities receiving help operate in the Victoria area. The directors discuss the needs of those asking for assistance and try to focus on groups who help individuals to help themselves.

Over the years the Foundation has grown thanks to the dedication of the family members/directors who have been proud to carry on with Henri and Marie's generous philosophy that "when much is received much should be given". In that spirit the Foundation currently has two of the family's third generation working to ensure its continuation of helping others. August 15, 2022  marked their 45th anniversary.

Honours 
In March 2011 the Government of British Columbia recognized the Côté family for their contributions to the Francophone community in Victoria over the course of many decades. Henri Côté's youngest daughter, Thérèse (Côté) Gerein received the honour on behalf of the family. A plaque was issued and placed in front of the Beacon Lodge.

References

External links 
 
 Victoria francophone family recognized (Archived)
 https://www.facebook.com/BeaconLodgeApartments
 https://www.youtube.com/watch?v=9bNIxxBIvQo&index=5&list=FLtBaGqvaActf-OswUcje8_Q
 https://www.youtube.com/watch?v=vfwV0AE-7hw&list=FLtBaGqvaActf-OswUcje8_Q&index=6

Apartment buildings in Canada
Buildings and structures in Victoria, British Columbia